The Fond du Lac Light is a lighthouse located at the entrance to the harbor and Yacht Club, in Fond du Lac, Wisconsin.  It is located on the southern end of Lake Winnebago. It is currently incorporated in the Fond du Lac City Seal. Construction of the lighthouse started in May 1933 and was completed shortly after October. It replaced an ordinary red light that previously marked the harbor entrance.

After years of neglect it was saved from demolition in 1967 and restored in 1993 with help from local community organizations.

The lighthouse is also the focal point of the seasonal holiday lights in Lakeside Park; a cutout of Rudolph the Red-Nosed Reindeer is adorned to the light house using the red light on top of the lighthouse as the nose.

Pending major rebuild for being crooked for the past 25 years.

References

Further reading

 Havighurst, Walter (1943) The Long Ships Passing: The Story of the Great Lakes, Macmillan Publishers.
 Oleszewski, Wes, Great Lakes Lighthouses, American and Canadian: A Comprehensive Directory/Guide to Great Lakes Lighthouses, (Gwinn, Michigan: Avery Color Studios, Inc., 1998) .
 
 Wright, Larry and Wright, Patricia, Great Lakes Lighthouses Encyclopedia Hardback (Erin: Boston Mills Press, 2006) .

External links
Lighthouse - Fond du Lac Area Convention & Visitors Bureau
Lighthouse friends article

USA Lights article

Lighthouses completed in 1933
Lighthouses in Wisconsin
Fond du Lac, Wisconsin
Buildings and structures in Fond du Lac County, Wisconsin
Tourist attractions in Fond du Lac County, Wisconsin